Tring Park School for the Performing Arts is an independent co-educational school in Tring, Hertfordshire, England, offering specialist courses in Dance, Commercial Music, Musical Theatre and Acting for 8–19 year olds. Originally known as the Arts Educational School, Tring Park, it was founded as the sister school of the Arts Educational School, London. In 2009 it became independent of the London school and was renamed Tring Park School for the Performing Arts.

Overview
Tring Park School for the Performing Arts is an independent, co-educational boarding and day school for pupils aged 8–19 years. It comprises a preparatory school, lower school, secondary school and sixth form and at a professional level. It is a specialist provider of vocational training in the performing arts, with a syllabus that includes Dance, Acting, Commercial Music and Musical Theatre. Vocational studies are supported by a full academic syllabus from Prep to A-level. As one of the leading schools for the performing arts in the United Kingdom, it is one of only twenty-one schools selected to allocate Government funded Dance and Drama Awards, a scholarship scheme established to subsidise the cost of professional dance and drama training for the most talented pupils at leading institutions.

History

The school was first founded in 1939 and was originally known as the Cone-Ripman School. It was formed as a result of a merger between the Cone School of Dancing founded in 1919 by Grace Cone, and the Ripman School founded in 1922 by Olive Ripman.

The schools were initially in two parts, the Cone studio located above Lilly & Skinner's shoe shop on Oxford Street and the Ripman in Baker Street. Cone-Ripman School was then based in premises at Stratford Place in London, but following the outbreak of World War II, it was relocated to Tring in Hertfordshire, using various rented buildings.  In 1941, the school reopened in London, but a second school continued to operate in Tring.  In 1945, the Rothschild Bank vacated the mansion at Tring Park, which had been its temporary base during the war, and the Rothschild family permitted the school to use the premises on a permanent basis. Tring Park remains the school's sole campus to this day and in 1947, the school was renamed the Arts Educational School, Tring Park, with the London school becoming the Arts Educational School, London.  In 1970, the school acquired the freehold of the mansion and grounds and began a redevelopment of the site, financed by the sale of unused land.  The refurbished building was officially opened in 1976 by the Duchess of Kent.  The school was later extended in 1990, with the opening of the Markova Theatre by The Prince Edward.  In 1993, the school purchased the former St Francis de Sales Convent for use as offsite boarding accommodation for senior pupils.  A second house was purchased for use as boarding accommodation in 1994.

Later in 1994, the Arts Educational Schools Trust decided that it was in the best interests of both the London and Tring schools, for them to be run separately.  This led to the formation of the AES Tring Park School Trust, which acquired the school and is now solely responsible for its ongoing management.  In 2009, to further identify the school as an independent institution, it changed its name to Tring Park School for the Performing Arts. The London school continues to operate, and is commonly known as ArtsEd.

For many years, the school's president was the renowned Prima Ballerina Assoluta, Dame Alicia Markova. After her death, Leopold David de Rothschild CBE became president and the vice presidents are Irek Mukhamedov OBE and Howard Goodall CBE.

History of the mansion
The current Tring Park Mansion was built to a design of Sir Christopher Wren in 1685, for Sir Henry Guy.

Sir William Gore, Lord Mayor of London, bought the house in 1705 and it remained in his family for two subsequent generations. in 1786, it was sold to Sir Drummond Smith, a London banker, who refurbished the interior in Georgian style and remodelled the park in the fashion made popular by "Capability" Brown.  William Kay, a Manchester textile magnate, bought the estate in 1823.

In 1838, Nathan de Rothschild began renting Tring Park as a summer residence. When the property was sold in 1872, Lionel de Rothschild bought it as a wedding present for his son, Sir Nathaniel (later Lord) de Rothschild.  Lord Rothschild's family grew up and lived at Tring Park until the death of the dowager Lady Rothschild in 1935.

The house was used by the NM Rothschild & Sons bank during World War II before being taken over by the Arts Educational School in 1945.

Notable former pupils

Actors/presenters/writers
Dame Julie Andrews, DBE (The Cone-Ripman School, Tring site) Actress best known for films Mary Poppins and The Sound of Music
 Joe Ashman, Actor, known for Free Rein, Doctors and Doctors
Dame Beryl Bainbridge, DBE (deceased), (The Cone-Ripman School, Tring site) Actress/writer  In 2008, The Times newspaper named Bainbridge among their list of "The 50 greatest British writers since 1945".
Aeronwy Thomas, (deceased), (Arts Educational School, Tring site) Writer/translator of Italian poetry and daughter of Dylan Thomas. Patron of the Dylan Thomas Society
Jane Seymour, OBE (Arts Educational School, Tring site) Hollywood actress, best known playing Bond girl Solitaire in the film  Live And Let Die and the TV series Dr. Quinn, Medicine Woman
Michael Learned, (Arts Educational School, Tring site) Actress, best known for her role in The Waltons
Thandie Newton, (Arts Educational School, Tring site) Hollywood actress and star of films such as; The Pursuit of Happyness, Run Fatboy Run, Mission: Impossible 2 and Crash
Bart Edwards, Actor, best known for TV series Lykkeland
Jessica Brown Findlay, Actress, best known for TV series Downton Abbey as a lead character: Lady Sybil Crawley (2010/11)
Amy Nuttall, Actress and singer, best known for West End musical Guys and Dolls, TV series Emmerdale & Downton Abbey (2011)
Emma Cunniffe, Actress, best known for BBC TV's series The Lakes
Caroline Quentin, Actress and comedian, best known for TV series Men Behaving Badly, Blue Murder and BBC's Life of Riley
Valerie Singleton, OBE, (Arts Educational School, Tring site) Former BBC TV co-presenter of Blue Peter, Nationwide, The Money Programme'.
Geraldine Somerville, Actress known for her role of; Lily Potter in the Harry Potter films and the film Gosford ParkLouise Griffiths, Songwriter/Singer/Actress, best known for BBC TV's Fame Academy (2003)
Claire Trévien, poet, author of The Shipwrecked HouseDaisy Ridley, actress best known for her leading role of 'Rey' in the Star Wars sequel trilogy
Aimee Kelly, actress best known in leading roles of 'Maddy Smith' in CBBC's Wolfblood and 'Kayla Richards' in 2011 movie, Sket''
Lily James, actress best known for Downton Abbey, Cinderella (2015 Disney film) and Baby Driver (2017) and War and Peace (2015)
Jordan Bolger, actor best known for Peaky Blinders, The 100, and The Woman King

Musical theatre
Sarah Brightman, (Arts Educational School, Tring site) Operatic singer, dancer and actress.  Celebrated star of Lloyd Webber's Phantom
Stephanie Lawrence (deceased) (Arts Educational School, Tring site) Musical theatre actress, celebrated star of;Lloyd Webber's Evita and original cast lead of Starlight Express
Charlie Bruce (Charlotte), Jazz Dancer/West End performer (Dirty Dancing) and winner of BBC1's, So You Think You Can Dance (UK) Season 1, (2010)

Ballet/dance
John Gilpin (deceased) (The Cone-Ripman School, Tring site), Classical ballet dancer, 'arguably the finest male dancer England has yet produced, the most purely classical'  founder member of Festival Ballet (now English National Ballet)
Rupert Pennefather, (Arts Educational School, Tring site), Principal Dancer of The Royal Ballet
Joshua Thew, Corps de Ballet, New York City Ballet

References

Bibliography
 Ben Stevenson OBE 'most influential mentors' Eve Pettinger http://findarticles.com/p/articles/mi_m1083/is_12_83/ai_n45144389/
 http://www.texasballettheater.org/?q=staff_stevenson

External links
 Official website
 https://web.archive.org/web/20110415083328/http://www.tring.gov.uk/info/artsed.htm

Private schools in Hertfordshire
Schools of the performing arts in the United Kingdom
Dance schools in the United Kingdom
Relocated schools
Tring
Member schools of the Independent Schools Association (UK)
Boarding schools in Hertfordshire